Alfons Dorfner (27 January 1911 – 22 January 1982) was an Austrian canoeist who competed in the 1936 Summer Olympics.

He was born in Lembach im Mühlkreis.

In 1936 he won the gold medal in the K-2 1000 metre competition with his partner Adolf Kainz. They also competed in the folding K-2 10000 metre event and finished fourth.

References
DatabaseOlympics.com profile

1911 births
1982 deaths
Austrian male canoeists
Canoeists at the 1936 Summer Olympics
Olympic canoeists of Austria
Olympic gold medalists for Austria
Olympic medalists in canoeing
Medalists at the 1936 Summer Olympics